Philotiella speciosa, the small blue, is a species of blue in the butterfly family Lycaenidae.

The MONA or Hodges number for Philotiella speciosa is 4370.

Subspecies
These four subspecies belong to the species Philotiella speciosa:
 Philotiella speciosa bohartorum (Tilden, 1969)
 Philotiella speciosa purisima Priestaf & J. Emmel in T. Emmel, 1998 (lompoc blue)
 Philotiella speciosa septentrionalis Austin in T. Emmel, 1998
 Philotiella speciosa speciosa (Hy. Edwards, 1877)

References

Further reading

 

Polyommatini
Articles created by Qbugbot
Butterflies described in 1877